The Alliance (commonly styled as Aliancia–Szövetség or Szövetség–Aliancia) is a political party in Slovakia that was founded by merging three political parties representing the Hungarian minority: the Party of the Hungarian Community, Most–Híd, and MKÖ–MKS. The party was founded on 22 November 2019 as an electoral alliance to run in the 2020 parliamentary election and was called the Hungarian Community Co-operation (MKÖ–MKS;). MKÖ–MKS consisted of the "Összefogás–Spolupatričnosť" movement, SMK–MKP, and the Hungarian Forum.

As a result of the 2022 regional elections, the party has the largest factions in the county councils of the Trnava and Nitra regions. Moreover, their candidates received the most votes of any party in the country, more than half a million.

History

Összefogás – Spolupatričnosť

The party began its formation in the autumn of 2019, citing disputes between the Hungarian parties as a reason for its formation, which could have caused the Hungarian minority not to be represented on the National Council after the 2020 Slovak parliamentary elections. Former Member of the European Parliament for SMK-MKP, Edit Bauer, and former Deputy Chairman of Hungarian Civic Party (MNI), Gábor Zászlós, were instrumental in the formation of the party.

MKÖ-MKS

In connection with the upcoming parliamentary elections, the members of Összefogás–Spolupatričnosť negotiated an electoral cooperation with four other ethnic Hungarian parties (Most–Híd, SMK-MKP, MKDA-MKDSZ the Hungarian Forum (MF-MF)). On 24 November 2019, Összefogás–Spolupatričnosť approved the joint action of the Hungarian parties in the parliamentary elections. Összefogás–Spolupatričnosť was then transformed into MKS, and gained 30 seats on the candidate list. Szabolcs Mózes, the party president, ran second on the list, Örs Orosz, the party vice president, ran sixth, and József Nagy, a former member of the European Parliament, ran ninth. Mózes stated that they were joining to ensure the representation of the Hungarian minority and to contribute to the change of government and the removal of the Smer-SD party from power.

After the failure of all Hungarian parties in the 2020 parliamentary election, MKÖ-MKS, SMK-MKP, and Most–Híd entered into negotiations about further cooperation. On 20 August 2020, they signed a declaration of cooperation in Komárno, a town in southwestern Slovakia. In March 2021, they announced that the negotiations had been successful, and that a new party "Aliancia – Szövetség" would be established. The new party would have three officers: a chairman nominated by SMK-MKP, a chairman of the Republican Council nominated by Most–Híd, and the post of expert vice-chairman nominated by MKÖ-MKS.

Aliancia – Szövetség

Aliancia – Szövetség was formed by merging the parties SMK-MKP, Most–Híd, and MKÖ-MKS at the assembly in Šamorín on 2 October 2021. The assembly was preceded by two years of negotiations between five Hungarian political parties about the possibility of cooperation. The goal of joining forces was declared as a return to parliament after the next election, or to be part of the governing coalition.

Krisztián Forró, the then-chairman of the SMK-MKP, became the chairman of the party, and the then-chairman of MKÖ-MKS, Szabolcs Mózes, was elected vice-chairman. In addition, the chairman of the Republican Council, László Sólymos, the then-chairman of the Most–Híd party, was elected, as well as the vice-chairman and chairmen of the platforms, members of the republican presidency, republican committee and mandatory commissions. Sólymos said: "We have laid the foundations for the political, parliamentary representation of the Hungarians, the nationalities and the regions in which we live". The Alliance declared that it would negotiate cooperation with all Slovak parties, such as support for the EU, NATO, and Visegrad Four membership, but would not cooperate with extremist parties like the People's Party Our Slovakia and Direction – Slovak Social Democracy.

Election results

National Council

Party leadership

MKÖ-MKS

 Szabolcs Mózes – Chairman (2019–2021)
 Örs Orosz – Deputy Chairman (2019–2021)

Aliancia – Szövetség

 Krisztián Forró – Chairman (2021–current)
 Szabolcs Mózes – Deputy Chairman (2021–current)
 László Sólymos – Chairman of the Republican Council (2021–current)

Notes

References

2021 establishments in Slovakia
Political parties established in 2021
Political parties in Slovakia
Political parties of minorities in Slovakia
Hungarian minority interests parties